Jake Willis Hackett (born 10 January 2000) is an English professional footballer who plays as a midfielder for Hebburn Town on loan from Whitby Town.

Career
Hackett joined Sunderland at the age of 8. He made his senior debut on 13 November 2018, in the EFL Trophy. In October 2019, Hackett joined Whitby Town on a one-month loan. On 15 November 2019, the deal was extended until 4 January 2020. He then returned to Sunderland, before re-joining Whitby on loan in early March 2020.

Hackett signed permanently for Whitby Town on 14 August 2021. On 2 December 2022, Hackett signed for Hebburn Town on a 28-day loan deal.

References

2000 births
Living people
English footballers
Association football midfielders
Sunderland A.F.C. players
Whitby Town F.C. players
Hebburn Town F.C. players
Northern Premier League players